was the one of the fifty-three stations of the Tōkaidō. It is located in Shinagawa, Tokyo, Japan. Along with Itabashi-shuku (Nakasendō), Naitō Shinjuku (Kōshū Kaidō) and Senju-shuku (Nikkō Kaidō and Ōshū Kaidō), it was one of the Four Stations of Edo (江戸四宿 Edo Shishuku). It was located in the present-day Shinagawa Port area near Shinagawa Station.

Neighboring post towns 
Tōkaidō
Nihonbashi - Shinagawa-juku - Kawasaki-juku

References 

Stations of the Tōkaidō
History of Tokyo